Lieutenant General Sir John Sharman Fowler,  (29 July 1864 – 20 September 1939) was a British Army engineer officer who specialised on telegraph on signals, and who was later Commander of British Forces in China.

Early life and education
Fowler was born in Navan, County Meath, the second son of Robert Fowler and Letitia Coddington. He was educated at Cheltenham College and the Royal Military College, Sandhurst. His elder sister Louisa married Sir Alexander Godley.

Military career
Fowler was commissioned into the Royal Engineers in 1886. He took part in the Izazai expedition in 1892, was promoted to captain on 24 September 1895, and went to Chitral in the North West Frontier of India in 1896. He also took part in the Tirah Expeditionary Force in the North West Frontier of India in 1897.

Fowler served in the Second Boer War as a member of the South Africa Field Force, and attached to the 2nd Division Telegraph Battalion, and was mentioned in despatches (dated 8 April 1902). Following the end of the war in June 1902, he received a brevet promotion to major in the South African Honours list published on 26 June 1902, and returned home with his division on the SS Britannic from Cape Town to Southampton in October that year. After his return, he was stationed with the 1st Division Telegraph Battalion, at Aldershot.

Fowler also served in the First World War as Director of Army Signals for the British Expeditionary Force. In 1921 he was appointed General Officer Commanding the Straits Settlements and the following year he was appointed Commander of British Forces in China. He retired in 1925.

Fowler was Colonel Commandant of the Royal Corps of Signals from 1923 to 1934.

Personal life
Fowler married Mary Olivia Henrietta Brooke in Ireland on 10 August 1904. They had two daughters.

Fowler died in Harrogate, Yorkshire, aged 75.

References

1864 births
1939 deaths
Military personnel from County Meath
British Army lieutenant generals
People from Navan
People educated at Cheltenham College
Graduates of the Royal Military College, Sandhurst
Royal Engineers officers
Knights Commander of the Order of the Bath
Knights Commander of the Order of St Michael and St George
Companions of the Distinguished Service Order
British military personnel of the Chitral Expedition
British military personnel of the Tirah campaign
British Army personnel of the Second Boer War
British Army generals of World War I